The canton of Manosque-2 (before March 2015: Manosque-Nord) is an administrative division in southeastern France. It consists of the northern part of the commune of Manosque and its northern suburbs. It includes the following communes:
Manosque (partly)
Saint-Martin-les-Eaux
Volx

Demographics

See also
Cantons of the Alpes-de-Haute-Provence department

References

Cantons of Alpes-de-Haute-Provence